Emma Vlasic (born September 2, 1996) is an American ice hockey forward, currently playing for the Connecticut Whale in the PHF.

Career 
Across four NCAA seasons at Yale, Vlasic put up 45 points in 113 games, serving as team captain in the 2018–19 season.

On the 1st of August 2019, Vlasic signed her first professional contract with the Connecticut Whale. In her rookie PHF season, Vlasic scored 9 goals in 24 games, leading the Whale in goals as the team finished last in the league. She was noted for her strong two-way play, finishing third in the league in faceoff percentage. She has been touted as a potential franchise centre for the club, being named to the 2020 NWHL All-Star Game for Team Dempsey.

Personal life
Vlasic was born on September 2, 1996, in Wilmette, Illinois to parents Tara and John, and grew up alongside her brothers Eric and Alex. She is of Yugoslavian descent; her grandfather immigrated to Montreal. Her brothers are also involved in hockey; Alex plays for the Chicago Blackhawks while Eric participated in the Chicago Blackhawks Special Hockey program. Her cousin Marc-Édouard plays professional hockey for the San Jose Sharks.

Career Statistics

External links

References 

American women's ice hockey forwards
Connecticut Whale (PHF) players
1996 births
Living people
People from Wilmette, Illinois
New Trier High School alumni
Ice hockey players from Illinois
21st-century American women